Music Played by Humans is the fifth solo studio album by British singer-songwriter Gary Barlow. The album was released by Polydor Records on 27 November 2020 and is Barlow's first solo album in seven years, following Since I Saw You Last in 2013. The album's lead single, "Elita" features both Michael Bublé and Sebastián Yatra, and was released on 30 September 2020.

The album debuted at the top of the UK Albums Chart dated 4 December 2020, becoming Barlow's third solo number-one album in the UK.

Background 
Music Played by Humans is Barlow's first solo album since 2013's Since I Saw You Last, and "sees [him] add a contemporary take to the orchestral and big band music he fell in love with as a child". The album includes songs recorded with an 80-piece orchestra, and was preceded by the Latin-inspired lead single "Elita" featuring singers Michael Bublé and Sebastián Yatra. Music Played by Humans also includes collaborations with Beverley Knight, Alesha Dixon, Chilly Gonzales, Barry Manilow, Ibrahim Maalouf, Avishai Cohen and James Corden.

Barlow was nearing completion on Take That's Greatest Hits Live tour in support of 2018's Odyssey when he envisioned the concept for the record, including "full orchestras, swing bands and string quartets", and more than 100 musicians in total. He told BBC News: "I went to Universal, the record company, and I said, 'Listen, I have got this idea but can I just record three songs? I don't mean demos, I want to put the orchestra on, I want to mix it, I want to get right down the road with three songs'. And so I did: Big string sections, brass sections, the whole thing. I really wanted to know that it was right. Then I played it to them and they just said, 'Listen, just go and finish the bloody thing. It's fantastic.'"

Singles 
 "Elita," featuring Michael Bublé and Sebastián Yatra, was released as the album's lead single on 30 September 2020.
 "Incredible" was released as the album's second single on 30 October 2020.
 "This Is My Time" was released as the album's third single on 13 November 2020.
 "Enough is Enough," featuring Beverley Knight, was released as the album's fourth single on 29 January 2021.

Commercial performance 
The album debuted at number one on the UK Albums Chart, with sales of 46,406 units, earning Barlow his third number-one solo album.

Track listing

Personnel

Musicians and vocals 
 Gary Barlow – vocals, additional programming (3), acoustic piano (8), keyboards (8, 10, 12, 14), programming (8, 10, 12)
 Ryan Carline – keyboards (1, 2, 5–13), programming (1, 2, 3, 5, 7–10, 12, 13), drum programming (1, 11), acoustic piano (3, 8, 12), electric piano (4, 8), synthesizers (8), bass (12, 14)
 Malcolm Edmonstone – acoustic piano (1, 2, 4, 7, 9, 13), string arrangements and conductor (2, 4, 8, 13), big band arrangements and conductor (9), orchestra arrangements and conductor (9, 11)
 James Wiltshire – keyboards (2, 4, 10), programming (2, 4, 10), drum programming (3), bass (4)
 Andres Munera – programming (3)
 Andrés Guerrero Ruíz – programming (3)
 Johan Carlsson – acoustic piano (3), programming (3), electric guitar (3), baritone guitar (3), drum programming (3), percussion (3), backing vocals (3)
 Fernando Toban – programming (3), electric guitar (3), 12-string acoustic guitar (3)
 Marlow Rosado – acoustic piano (6)
 Daniel K. Mandelman – organ (6)
 Michael Freeman – keyboards (8, 10), programming (8, 10)
 Chilly Gonzales – acoustic piano (11), keyboards (11)
 Tommy Emmerton – guitars (1, 9)
 Justin Quinn – nylon guitar (3), tres (3), guitars (8)
 Loz Garratt – bass (1)
 Guy Pratt – bass (2)
 Jo Nichols – bass (5)
 Luis Guerra – bass (6)
 Avishai Cohen – bass (9)
 Ralph Salmins – drums (1)
 Brad Webb – drums (2, 4, 10)
 Michael Longoria – drums (6)
 Doug Harper – drums (9)
 Lewis Wright – percussion (1), vibraphone (1)
 Ash Soan – percussion (2, 3, 10, 12)
 Alberto Lopez – percussion (6)
 Camilla Pay – harp (5, 9)
 Carlos Sosa – saxophones (6), horn arrangements (6)
 Raul Vallejo – trombone (6)
 Fernando Castillo – trumpet (6)
 Ibrahim Maalouf – trumpet (8)
 Ben Edwards – trumpet (12)
 Stella Le Page – cello (11)
 Evan Jolly – big band arrangements (1, 2, 10), string arrangements (1)
 Tom Richards – big band arrangements (1, 4, 7, 10, 13), string arrangements (1, 7), big band conductor (2, 4, 13), brass arrangements and conductor (3, 8, 11)
 Angela Ricci – backing vocals (1, 2, 10)
 Hayley Carline – backing vocals (2, 4)
 Michael Bublé – vocals (3)
 Sebastián Yatra – vocals (3)
 Peter Carlsson – backing vocals (3)
 Beverley Knight – vocals (6)
 Alesha Dixon – vocals (12), backing vocals (12)
 James Corden – vocals (13)

Technical and design 
 Ryan Carline – engineer, mixing (5, 7, 8, 9, 11–14)
 John Hanes – mix engineer (3)
 Mark "Spike" Stent – mixing (1, 2, 4)
 Matt Wolach – mix assistant (1, 2, 4)
 Serban Ghenea – mixing (3)
 Charlie Kramsky – mixing (6)
 Kevin Grainger – mixing (10)
 Randy Merrill – mastering at Sterling Sound (New York City, New York)
 Studio Fury – art direction, design 
 Benjamin Lennox – photography

Charts

Weekly charts

Year-end charts

Certifications

References 

2020 albums
Gary Barlow albums
Polydor Records albums